Zé Pereira dos Lacaios is a carnival block from Ouro Preto, Brazil. Founded in 1867, it is the oldest carnival block in the country which is still active.

History 

The Portuguese shoemaker José Nogueira Paredes paraded at the first day of the 1846 carnival in the center of Rio de Janeiro. His block gained attention from enthusiasts, musicians and organizers for the carnival proceedings.

José relocated to Ouro Preto in 1867 to work at the local Governor's palace (the city was then the capital of Minas Gerais). Together with other workers from the palace, he created the block "Zé Pereira Clube dos Lacaios".

The block 

The use of smoking jackets, top hats  and lanterns is a characteristic of the block since its inception.

Another characteristic are the gigantones. The first three where the characters Catitão, Baiana and Benedito. Later other gigantones were added, such as Tiradentes, Jair Boêmio and Sinhá Olímpia.

References

Brazilian Carnival
Parades in Brazil
1867 establishments in Brazil